Admiral Abdullah al-Sultan was a Saudi Arabian military officer and formerly commander of the Royal Saudi Navy. He was succeeded by Fahad al-Ghafli.

Ordered to step down

On 4 November 2017, Abdullah bin Sultan bin Mohammed Al-Sultan was ordered to step down, and replaced by Fahad al-Ghafli. This was following a "corruption crackdown" conducted by a new royal anti-corruption committee. The order came from Crown Prince Mohammad Bin Salman.

References

Saudi Arabian military personnel
Living people
Year of birth missing (living people)